Larry Floyd Stahl (born June 29, 1941) is an American retired professional baseball outfielder. He played in Major League Baseball from 1964 to 1973 for the Kansas City Athletics, New York Mets, San Diego Padres, and Cincinnati Reds.

Stahl was signed by the Athletics in 1960 as an amateur free agent. He broke into the big leagues on September 11, 1964, going 0-1 as a pinch-hitter against Wally Bunker in a 5-2 Kansas City loss to the Baltimore Orioles in Memorial Stadium. After brief appearances in several more games, he notched his first career hit on September 19 at Yankee Stadium in an 8-3 loss to the New York Yankees. Pinch-hitting for pitcher Orlando Peña in the sixth inning, he hit a ground-rule double off Ralph Terry.

Playing for the Padres on September 2, 1972, against the Chicago Cubs at Wrigley Field, Stahl drew one of the most questionable bases on balls in baseball history — if only because of the circumstances surrounding it. Cubs pitcher Milt Pappas had retired the first 26 Padres hitters and was one strike away from a perfect game with a 2-2 count against pinch-hitter Stahl. However, home plate umpire Bruce Froemming called the next two pitches, both of which were close, balls. To date, the perfect game bid is the only one in Major League history to be broken up by a walk to the 27th batter. Pappas secured his no-hitter by retiring Garry Jestadt one batter later.

Primarily an outfielder, his best year was 1971 at age 30 when, in 114 games for the Padres, he hit .253 with eight home runs and 36 runs batted in. He had exactly 400 career hits. His contract was purchased by the Reds on December 1, 1972. In his one postseason appearance, the 1973 National League Championship Series, playing for the Reds he had two hits in four at bats.

References

External links

1941 births
Living people
Albuquerque Dukes players
Baseball players from Illinois
Birmingham Barons players
Cincinnati Reds players
Jacksonville Suns players
Kansas City Athletics players
Lewiston Broncs players
Major League Baseball outfielders
Minot Mallards players
New York Mets players
Phoenix Giants players
Salt Lake City Bees players
San Diego Padres players
Sportspeople from Belleville, Illinois
Tidewater Tides players
Vancouver Mounties players
Visalia A's players